The Capps Medal is the medal awarded to the "best and fairest" player in the South Australian Baseball League during the regular season (i.e. not including finals matches) as decided upon by umpires. It is regarded as the most prestigious award for individual players in the league.
The medal was created and designed by Charles James Capps (best known as "Jim" Capps), who presented the medal up to the 1980/1981 season. He died in January 1985. Since the 1981/1982 season, the medal has been presented by his son, Dr. Roger Capps.

Voting Process
Under the current process, at the conclusion of each game the chief umpire awards 3 votes, 2 votes and 1 vote to the players they regard as the best, second best and third best in the match respectively.

On the awards night, the votes over the home and away (regular) season are tallied and the eligible player or players with the highest number of votes is awarded the medal.

Recipients
The first recipient of the Capps Medal was Charlie Puckett in 1936.

Fourteen recipients have won the Capps Medal on more than one occasion. Both Don Rice and Greg Elkson are five-time Capps Medalists.

(i) = Import (Non-National)

(*) = Deceased player

References

Baseball in Australia
Australian sports trophies and awards